Those Who Cross the Line is a South Korean television entertainment program and televised on MBC.

Season 1 is shown on every Friday, starting 30 March and ended on 14 September 2018.

Season 2 is shown on every Saturday, starting 16 February and ended on 23 March 2019.

Season 3 is shown on every Sunday, starting 18 August 2019 and ended on 13 December 2020.

Season 4 is shown on every Sunday, starting 25 April 2021 with new master and another guest as X. It was change to Wednesday as of 1 December 2021 and the show ended on 22 December 2021.

Overview

Season 1
The program is a 20-episode series program that compares and contrasts different histories, cultures, and arts as if they resemble the two nations facing the border. It is a new concept that takes away from everyday life that can only be felt locally to a unique history. The program was originally a 16 episodes series but got extended due to its popularity.

Season 2
The second season, Those who cross the line - Korean Peninsula, is a 6-episode series program that compares and contrasts on the history of Korean Peninsula and to commemorate the 100th anniversary of March 1st Movement and Provisional Government. This second season is based on the success of the first season and Seol Min-seok's wishes to visit/cross the Military Demarcation Line (MDL) as mentioned in the opening premier of the Season 2 when the five cast members met. Before visiting the MDL, the cast will learn about the history of Korean Peninsula, particularly on the topics on "Those who tried to protect their borders" from history teacher, Seol Min-seok and invited guests.

Season 3
The third season, Those who cross the line - Returns, is the continuation with the success of the Season 2 and is to visit the hidden historical sites all over the South Korea. The excitement is the journey to find the true story that cannot learn from history books. Furthermore, it is expected that we will make a meaningful move that draws together the stories of yesterday, today, and tomorrow that we have not known yet. In addition, invited guests will visit each historical site to make the Korean history exploration more enriching and enjoyable.

Season 4
The fourth season, Those who cross the line - Master X, is a comeback with an expanded version that crosses the history as well as various 'line of knowledge'. A new world of knowledge to be with the best masters in Korea! Who is the unknown Master X who will cross the line of knowledge every week, such as History vs Science, History vs Psychology and History vs Art.

Airtime

Cast

Season 1

Season 2

Season 3

Season 4

Episodes

Season 1

Season 2

Season 3

Season 4

Ratings

Season 1

Season 2

The show will be aired in two parts. Only the higher rating of the episode will be shown.

Season 3

The show will be aired in two parts. Only the higher rating of the episode will be shown.

The show will be aired in two parts. Only the higher rating of the episode will be shown.

Season 4

The show will be aired in two parts. Only the higher rating of the episode will be shown.

Awards and nominations

Controversy

Season 1

Jordanian Image Mistake
On 11 June 2018, the production crew of MBC "선을 넘는 녀석들" wrote in the official Instagram that some Jordanian-Israel-Palestine editions broadcast on Friday, 8 June, have pointed out that "the part that used the image of Muhammad as a prophet of Islam and the part that used the rock dome together with the flag of a certain country". The production crew has issued an official apology, in both Korean and English version, for telling people of particular religions and views.

Season 3

Seol Min-seok's plagiarism of his master's thesis
On 30 December 2020, there was a report that Seol Min-seok's thesis on 'A Study on the Ideological Controversy Appearing in Textbooks of Modern and Contemporary Korean History' for which he received his master's degree at the Yonsei University Graduate School of Education in 2010 was 52% plagiarised. Seol admit that in his research in writing the thesis, he neglected citations and footnotes in the process of referencing other papers. Due to the plagiarism allegation, Seol resigned from all the programs he was cast in and MBC decided to end season 3 of the program to reorganise.

References

External links
 
 

2020s South Korean television series
2018 South Korean television series debuts
2021 South Korean television series endings
South Korean travel television series
Korean-language television shows
MBC TV original programming